Badkan (، also Romanized as Bādkān) is a village in Palanganeh Rural District, in the Central District of Javanrud County, Kermanshah Province, Iran. At the 2006 census, its population was 31, in 9 families.

References 

Populated places in Javanrud County